HD 222060, also known as HR 8957, is a solitary, orange hued star located in the southern circumpolar constellation Octans. It has an apparent magnitude of 5.98, allowing it to be faintly visible to the naked eye. Based on parallax measurements from GAIA, the object is estimated to be 536 light years distant.

This is an evolved giant star that is currently on the red giant branch, fusing a hydrogen shell around a helium core. HD 222060 a stellar classification of K0 II/III, a K-type star with the blended luminosity class of a giant and a bright giant. It has 3.2 times the mass of the Sun and is currently 318 million years old.

References

K-type giants
K-type bright giants

Octantis, 84
Octans

222060
116653
8957
PD-77 01583